Proportionalism is an ethical theory that lies between consequential theories and deontological theories.  Consequential theories, like utilitarianism, say that an action is right or wrong, depending on the consequences it produces, but deontological theories, such as Immanuel Kant's categorical imperative, say that actions are either intrinsically right or intrinsically wrong. Proportionalist theories like rule utilitarianism, however, say that it is never right to go against a principle unless a proportionate reason would justify it.

In the 1960s, proportionalism was a consequentialist attempt to develop natural law, a principally Roman Catholic teleological theory most strongly associated with the 13th-century scholastic theologian Thomas Aquinas, but also found in Church Fathers such as Maximus the Confessor and John of Damascus, as well as early pagan schools of philosophy such as Stoicism. The moral guidelines set down by Roman Catholic magisterial teachings of Natural Moral Law are mostly upheld in that intrinsically evil acts are still classified so. In certain situations where there is a balance of ontic goods and ontic evils (ontic evils are those that are not immoral but merely cause pain or suffering, ontic goods are those that alleviate pain or suffering). Proportionalism asserts that one can determine the right course of action by weighing up the good and the necessary evil caused by the action. As a result, proportionalism aims to choose the lesser of evils. Pope John Paul II rules out the 1960s proportionalism in his encyclicals Veritatis Splendor, promulgated in 1993 (cf. section 75), and in Evangelium Vitae, 1995 (cf. article 68). Instead he offers an account of moral action based on the object of the act (finis operis), the intention of the person performing the act (finis operantis), and the circumstances surrounding the action.

See also
Doctrine of double effect
Just war theory
Prima facie right
Situational ethics
Summum bonum

References

Normative ethics